Carl or Karl Jenkins is the name of:

Real people
 Karl Jenkins (born 1944), Welsh musician and composer
 Karl Jenkins, American rapper, known professionally as Dice Raw

Characters 
 Carl Jenkins, General/Doctor, Minister of Paranormal Warfare in Starship Troopers film
 Carl Jenkins (Oz), an inmate of Aryan Brotherhood on the HBO drama Oz